One is the debut studio album by British progressive metal band Tesseract. Released on 22 March 2011, the album features six tracks. The third track, "Concealing Fate", was split into six parts for a total length of twenty seven minutes and forty seconds. This was Tesseract's only full-length release with vocalist Daniel Tompkins until his return in 2014.  A bonus track entitled "Hollow" was released digitally to those who pre-ordered One from Century Media.

A live studio play through of "Concealing Fate" was also included as a bonus DVD along with the album. In September 2011, an instrumental version was released digitally and in October that year both the album and the instrumental version were released on vinyl as a double LP.
"Nascent" was released as a promotional single in February 2011, and music videos were released for both "Nascent" and "Deception". Acoustic renditions of "Perfection", "April" and "Origin" were featured on the band's second EP Perspective, which released the following year.

Track listing

Chart performance

Personnel

Tesseract
Acle Kahney - Guitars
Amos Williams - Bass
Daniel Tompkins - Vocals
James Monteith - Guitars
Jay Postones - Drums

Production
Acle Kahney - programming, mixing, digital editing, engineering
Amos Williams - artwork design, programming, mixing, digital editing, producing
Francesco Cameli - engineering, mixing, producing
Rob Mestas - post-production, digital editing
Greg Marriott - additional engineering
Ronan Phelan - additional engineering
Mo Panella - digital editing
Andrew Baldwin - mastering

References

2011 debut albums
Tesseract (band) albums
Century Media Records albums